MQJ may refer to:
 Indianapolis Regional Airport (FAA LID: MQJ), Indiana, United States
 Mamasa language
 Moma Airport (IATA: MQJ), Sakha Republic, Russia